The Khartoum International Stadium is a multi-purpose stadium in Khartoum, Sudan.  It is currently used mostly for football matches.  The stadium has a capacity of 23,000 people. It is also the home stadium of the Sudanese national football team and of the club Al Ahli SC Khartoum. In 2010, it was renovated for the 2011 African cup of nations championships .

History
The stadium was inaugurated in 1957 under the name of Municipal Stadium to host the first African football competition of nations, the 1957 African Cup of Nations. It also hosted the 1970 African Cup of Nations and the 2011 African Nations Championship. The stadium is used for both men's and women's football.

Other Sudanese stadiums 

The Khartoum Stadium is the third largest stadium in Sudan.

References

External links
Profile's stadium - kooora.com

Sports venues in Sudan
Football venues in Sudan
Sudan
Multi-purpose stadiums in Sudan
Buildings and structures in Khartoum
Sport in Khartoum